The Baker County Courthouse is located in Courthouse Square at Newton in Baker County, Georgia. It was added to the National Register of Historic Places on September 18, 1980. Baker County has been struck by flooding from the Flint River. The old courthouse was built in 1906 and was damaged by the floods of 1925, 1929, and 1994. It houses the public library and the historical society. The current courthouse is located in a 1930s-era school. The old courthouse was designed by J. W. Golucke. The courthouse was damaged during Hurricane Michael in October 2018.

References

County courthouses in Georgia (U.S. state)
Courthouses on the National Register of Historic Places in Georgia (U.S. state)
Buildings and structures in Baker County, Georgia
Government buildings completed in 1906
National Register of Historic Places in Baker County, Georgia
1906 establishments in Georgia (U.S. state)